The 2016 Chevrolet Silverado 250 was a NASCAR Camping World Truck Series race held at Canadian Tire Motorsport Park in Bowmanville, Ontario, Canada on Sunday September 4, 2016. The race was the 4th event held by the Truck Series at this racetrack. In the end, John Hunter Nemechek would win in an incredible finish over Cole Custer by .034 seconds. The race also became notable for the post-race scuffle between Nemechek and Custer.

Background

Track

Canadian Tire Motorsport Park is a multi-track motorsport venue located north of Bowmanville, in Ontario, Canada. The name "Mosport" is a portmanteau of Motor Sport, came from the enterprise formed to build the track.

Entry List
(R) denotes rookie driver
(i) denotes driver who is ineligible for series driver points

Qualifying
Cole Custer won the pole for the race with a time of 1:19.175 and a speed of 111.808 mph.

* – Jennifer Jo Cobb, Christopher Bell, Austin Wayne Self, Ben Rhodes, Tommy Joe Martins, Travis Kvapil, Norm Benning, and Matt Crafton all had to move to the rear due to unapproved adjustments.

Race
Pole sitter Cole Custer led the first lap of the race. On lap 8, the first caution of the race flew when Ben Rhodes crashed into the tire barriers in turn 8. On the restart, Custer kept his lead from Daniel Hemric. On lap 26, the second caution flew when the 20 minute caution clock, that was invented before the season started, expired. On the restart on lap 30, Custer kept his lead from 2nd place Hemric. On the next lap on lap 31, Hemric took the lead when Custer went to pit road to make his pit stop. On the next lap, Hemric and 2nd place Austin Cindric also went to make their pitstops giving Matt Crafton the lead. On lap 36, Crafton made his pit stop giving the lead to Spencer Gallagher. Gallagher then pitted on lap 38 giving his lead to John Hunter Nemechek. With 21 laps to go, the third caution flew when the caution clock expired for the second and final time of the race. Nemechek kept his lead on the restart with 17 laps to go. With 16 to go, Tyler Reddick got spun by Kaz Grala in turn 8. Reddick kept his truck going and no caution was flown. With 8 to go, the fourth caution flew for a 5 truck crash in turns 5 a and b. It started when Rico Abreu turned Cameron Hayley in 5a when Abreu clipped the grass and came up into Hayley turning both of them around. Abreu then clipped Gary Klutt giving Klutt some drivers side damage before Hayley came down and collected Ryan Truex and Brett Moffitt.

Final laps
The race restarted with 8 laps to go. But out of turn 1, Kaz Grala got hit by Matt Crafton and then turned by Christopher Bell and hit the wall on the right side of the track collecting Rico Abreu bringing out the 5th caution. The race restarted with 4 laps to go with Cole Custer being the new race leader. But on the same lap, Travis Kvapil's truck stalled bringing out the 6th and final caution of the race and setting up an overtime finish. On the restart, Custer kept his lead while Nemechek fell back to third. Nemechek passed Spencer Gallagher in turn 7 to get second place back and set up a fantastic finish against Cole Custer. Before they took the white flag, Gallagher got turned by Austin Cindric in turn 10 but no caution was flown, On the final lap, Custer was ahead of Nemechek by .712 seconds in turn 1. But Nemechek closed the gap on Custer in turns 2 and 3. Nemechek soon made up a lot of ground on Custer in turns 5a and b. Nemechek attempted to bump and run Custer in turn 8 but failed. Nemechek tried again in turn 9 but Custer still had the lead as Nemechek tried to look into Custer's left side. In turn 10, Nemechek tried to cross-over Custer and hooked him in the left rear sending him up the race track and Nemechek got side by side with Custer. Coming to the checkered, Nemechek turned left into Custer pinning him against the wall and the two went through the grass making contact while Austin Cindric spun in the last turn behind them. Nemechek crossed the line first by .034 seconds in front of Custer.

Post race
Although Nemechek crossed the finish line first, a winner was still to be determined. The unofficial results posted that the third place truck in Daniel Hemric actually won the race and Nemechek and Custer's positions didn't count due to the trucks not getting picked up by the electric timing and scoring. Believing he won the race, Nemechek did burnouts, got out of his truck, and went to the flag stand waiting for the flagman to give the checkered flag to him. While he was waiting, Nemechek looked to his left and saw that Custer was running towards him after Custer crawled out of his truck from the pit. Nemechek attempted to find a way to dodge him but instead braced himself for the impact. Custer grabbed Nemechek's helmet and tackled Nemechek to the ground. Both were separated by their own crews and NASCAR Officials. Eventually, NASCAR declared that Nemechek won the race, his second win of 2016. Custer, Daniel Hemric, Matt Crafton, and Christopher Bell rounded out the top 5 while Tyler Reddick, Johnny Sauter, Ben Kennedy, Cameron Hayley, and William Byron rounded out the top 10. "We didn't wreck him for the win," Nemechek said. "Rubbings Racing."

Race results

References

2016 in NASCAR
2016 in Ontario
NASCAR races at Canadian Tire Motorsport Park